Ernest Rogez (16 March 1908 – 24 March 1986) was a French water polo player who competed in the 1928 Summer Olympics.

See also
 List of Olympic medalists in water polo (men)

References

External links
 

1908 births
1986 deaths
Sportspeople from Tourcoing
French male water polo players
Olympic water polo players of France
Water polo players at the 1928 Summer Olympics
Olympic bronze medalists for France
Olympic medalists in water polo
Medalists at the 1928 Summer Olympics
20th-century French people